Protautoga is an extinct genus of prehistoric ray-finned fish, that lived in the Middle Miocene. Fossils have been found in the Paraná Formation of Argentina and the Calvert Formation of Virginia.

See also 

 Prehistoric fish
 List of prehistoric bony fish

References 

Prehistoric perciform genera
Miocene fish
Prehistoric fish of North America
Miocene United States
Prehistoric fish of South America
Neogene Argentina
Fossils of Argentina
Fossil taxa described in 1873